The Virginia International Tattoo is a military tattoo that began in 1997 and is the signature event of the Virginia Arts Festival. Presented annually in Norfolk, Virginia, the tattoo is an exhibition of military bands, massed pipes and drums, military drill teams, Celtic dancers, and choirs. It is presented in cooperation with NATO and the Norfolk NATO Festival.

It is the largest show of its kind in the United States, involving a cast of over 1,000 artists from many different countries, and over 38,000 people attend each year, including over 16,000 area students at the annual student matinees. The Virginia International Tattoo was listed as American Bus Association's Top North American Event for 2016.
The tattoo is considered to be one of the seven “founding members” of the International Association of Tattoo Organizers (IATO).  Unfortunately, the Tattoo, like many other events, did not take place in 2020 due to the COVID-19 pandemic.

History 
The term "tattoo" derives from the cries of the 17th and 18th-century Dutch innkeepers who, as the fifes and drums of the local regiment signaled a return to quarters, would cry, "Doe den tap toe!" "Turn off the taps!".  The sound of "taps" led to an impromptu parade back to barracks. Over time, the words of that cry evolved into the term "tattoo," which now refers to a ceremonial performance of military music by massed bands.

Highlights

Tattoo Weekend Events 

Hullabaloo is a free outdoor festival of pipers, dancers, drill teams and drum lines which starts three hours prior to each performance of the Virginia International Tattoo. A variety of food and beer is available for purchase. The event is located on Scope Plaza, Norfolk, Virginia.

DrumLine Battle at the Tattoo 
A Hullabaloo favorite, DrumLine Battle™ showcases marching percussion ensembles of any instrumentation and any skill level year-round, spotlighting their unique talents and creativity in a high energy face-to-face competition. DrumLine Battle is a program of Drum Corps International. This event is located on Scope Plaza, Norfolk, Virginia.

Highland Heavy Athletic Championship 
The Virginia International Tattoo is partnering with Brute Strength Gym for a Heavy Athletic Championship, Highland-style, with a caber toss, keg toss and more.
Free, Norfolk, Virginia

Virginia International Tattoo American Pipe Band Championship 
The Virginia International Tattoo will host the Third Annual Virginia International Tattoo American Pipe Band Championship on Scope Plaza in Norfolk, Virginia. The competition, which coincides with the Tattoo performance weekend, will feature hundreds of bagpipers and drummers as they compete for the honors in this annual competition.
This event is located on Scope Plaza, Norfolk, Virginia.

Norfolk NATO Festival 
The Norfolk NATO Festival is a celebration and reflection of the North Atlantic Treaty Organization countries and the bond they have. Member nations are on display through the kickoff parade, NATO village, kids zone, music, performances and food. Attendees learn about each culture and its history.

Parade of Nations 
The Norfolk NATO Festival's highlight is the annual Parade of Nations, the longest continuous parade in Hampton Roads and the only Parade in the United States honoring NATO. Over 100 Parade Units with local and visiting high school bands, US and International Military bands, and colorful floats which represent each of the 29 NATO member nations and their respective armed forces, are featured. Local community organization and Festival partners are also featured. This event is located at Town Point Park, Norfolk, Virginia. The civil-military parade and pageant involves a cast of over 800 artists from many different countries, and has over 28,000 people attending every year, including over 12,000 area students at the annual student matinees. 

The Virginia International Tattoo is, since 2007, one of the seven founding members of the International Association of Tattoo Organizers (IATO).

Norfolk NATO Festival Flag Raising 

The Flag Raising ceremony is a cultural sampling of music and a colorful display of NATO Member National flags and uniforms in this military presentation representing all 29 NATO member nations. Each Nation's representative will present the national flag, while a portion of their national anthem is performed by the United States Fleet Forces Band.  This custom was not observed in the 2022 flag raising, where only the NATO hymn and US national anthem were played.

References

External links
Official website
IATO: International Association of Tattoo Organizers
Virginia Arts Festival
 Virginia International Tattoo: Swiss Army Central Band

1997 establishments in Virginia
Military tattoos
Recurring events established in 1997
Culture of Norfolk, Virginia